

26001–26100 

|-id=002
| 26002 Angelayeung ||  || Angela Yu-Yun Yeung (born 1992) is a finalist in the 2010 Intel Science Talent Search (STS), a science competition for high school seniors, for her materials and bioengineering project. She attends the Davis Senior High School, Davis, California || 
|-id=003
| 26003 Amundson ||  || Lauren Amundson (born 1984) is the librarian/archivist for Lowell Observatory. As such, she is the curator for the Observatory's historical collection which includes extensive material from Percival Lowell's personal research and travels. || 
|-id=004
| 26004 Loriying ||  || Lori Ying (born 1992) is a finalist in the 2010 Intel Science Talent Search (STS), a science competition for high school seniors, for her animal sciences project. She attends the South Side High School, Rockville Centre, New York || 
|-id=005
| 26005 Alicezhao ||  || Alice Wei Zhao (born 1993) is a finalist in the 2010 Intel Science Talent Search (STS), a science competition for high school seniors, for her materials and bioengineering project. She attends the Sheboygan North High School, Sheboygan, Wisconsin || 
|-id=007
| 26007 Lindazhou ||  || Linda Zhou (born 1992) is a finalist in the 2010 Intel Science Talent Search (STS), a science competition for high school seniors, for her biochemistry project. She attends the Academy for Medical Science Technology, Hackensack, New Jersey || 
|-id=011
| 26011 Cornelius ||  || Frank Cornelius (born 1961), Engineering Manager at Lowell Observatory, was pivotal in maintaining performance of the Discovery Channel Telescope (DCT) and the Naval Precision Optical Interferometer (NPOI). He previously served as DCT Senior Site Engineer, DCT Site Engineer and NPOI Site Engineer. || 
|-id=012
| 26012 Sanborn ||  || Jason Sanborn (born 1975), Night Operations Manager at Lowell Observatory, leads the nightly operations teams at the Discovery Channel Telescope (DCT) and the Naval Precision Optical Interferometer (NPOI). Jason served as a DCT Operator, NPOI Observer and LONEOS Observer. || 
|-id=013
| 26013 Amandalonzo ||  || Amanda Alonzo mentored a finalist in the 2010 Intel Science Talent Search (STS), a science competition for high school seniors. She teaches at the Lynbrook High School, San Jose, California || 
|-id=027
| 26027 Cotopaxi || 4861 P-L || Cotopaxi, the 5897-m active volcano situated in the Andes in Ecuador, south of Quito. || 
|-id=057
| 26057 Ankaios || 4742 T-2 || Ancaeus, in Greek mythology, one of the Argonauts, father of Agapenor. || 
|-id=074
| 26074 Carlwirtz || 1977 TD || Carl Wilhelm Wirtz (1875–1939), German astronomer, the first, in 1924, to prove the existence of a redshift-distance relationship for spiral nebulae || 
|-id=075
| 26075 Levitsvet ||  || Lev Ivanovich Tsvetkov (born 1938), head of the laboratory of radio astronomy of the Crimean Astrophysical Observatory since 2002, is known for designing and developing instrumentation for observations of solar radio emission, for seeking and identifying global oscillations of the sun and for forecasting solar activity || 
|-id=080
| 26080 Pablomarques || 1980 EF || Pablo Gutierrez-Marques (born 1975), of the Max Planck Institute for Solar System Research, Göttingen, had significant responsibility for the acquisition and processing of the scientific images of Vesta obtained by the Dawn spacecraft. || 
|-id=087
| 26087 Zhuravleva ||  || Lyudmila Zhuravleva (born 1946), a Russian–Ukrainian astronomer, discoverer of minor planets, and staff member of the Institute of Theoretical Astronomy (ITA) from 1972 to 1998. || 
|-id=092
| 26092 Norikonoriyuki || 1987 SF || Noriko Shimizu (born 1974) is a daughter of the discoverer. She and her husband, Noriyuki Shimizu (born 1966), regularly participate in public viewing nights at Geisei Observatory. || 
|-id=097
| 26097 Kamishi ||  || Kami is a city 20 km east of Kochi city of Japan. It is well-known for its natural beauty and as Japan's only landing site of a stony-iron meteorite. The famous Ryugado limestone cave is also located in the city. || 
|}

26101–26200 

|-id=119
| 26119 Duden ||  || Konrad Duden (1829–1911), German philologist and author of the Duden, a key dictionary of the German language. It is the basis for uniform orthography in the German-speaking world and has since gone through more than 20 revised editions. || 
|-id=122
| 26122 Antonysutton ||  || Antony Cyril Sutton (1925–2002) studied economics at universities in London, Göttingen and California. At Stanford University's Hoover Institution he wrote his three-volume study Western Technology and Soviet Economic Development between 1968 and 1973. || 
|-id=123
| 26123 Hiroshiyoshida || 1992 OK || Hiroshi Yoshida (born 1968) is an amateur astronomer and has been involved in the networking of people running stargazing parties in eastern Japan. He also promotes exchange of information, reporting on research activity, and get-togethers for amateur astronomers involved in outreach activity. || 
|-id=127
| 26127 Otakasakajyo ||  || Otakasakajyo is the former name of the medieval castle that stands on a hill with a sweeping view of Kochi City and serves as the city's symbol || 
|-id=151
| 26151 Irinokaigan ||  || Irino, a beautiful beach ("kaigan") lined with pine groves, is located in Kuroshio, Kochi prefecture. The town's museum, displaying various objects washed up on the beach and brought by the Kuroshio current from faraway places, captivates the visitors with romantic fascination || 
|-id=168
| 26168 Kanaikiyotaka ||  || Kiyotaka Kanai (born 1951), Japanese amateur astronomer, member of "Ota Uchuno Kai" astronomical group, independent discoverer of comet C/1970 B1 and co-discoverer of asteroid 7752 Otauchunokai. || 
|-id=169
| 26169 Ishikawakiyoshi || 1995 YY || Akiyoshi Ishikawa (born 1955), a Japanese amateur astronomer, is a member of the "Ota Uchuno Kai" astronomical group. A devoted comet observer, he has had more than 1100 visual magnitude estimates published in the International Comet Quarterly since 1980. The name was suggested by A. Nakamura. || 
|-id=170
| 26170 Kazuhiko ||  || Kazuhiko Ichikawa (born 1956), a Japanese amateur astronomer, is one of the founders of the Yamaneko Group of Comet Observers and a member of the "Ota Uchuno Kai" astronomical group. An organizer of the Cometary Summer School, an advanced workshop for comet research, he has mentored many amateur comet researchers. || 
|-id=177
| 26177 Fabiodolfi ||  || Fabio Dolfi (born 1966), an Italian amateur astronomer who has devoted all his spare time to astronomy. Beginning in 1978, he took a special interest tn the photography of deep-sky objects. Subsequently, he collaborated with the program for astrometry of minor planets at the Pistoia Mountains Astronomical Observatory in San Marcello, Italy. || 
|-id=183
| 26183 Henrigodard ||  || Henri Godard (born 1937) is a professor of French literature at the Universities of Diderot and Sorbonne in Paris. || 
|-id=188
| 26188 Zengqingcun ||  || Zeng Qingcun (born 1935) is a leading atmospheric scientist and an Academician of the Chinese Academy of Sciences. He is one of the founders of modern numerical weather forecast by using atmospheric primitive equations in the world, and won the State Preeminent Science and Technology Award of China in 2019. || 
|-id=194
| 26194 Chasolivier ||  || Charles P. Olivier (1884–1975) was an American astronomer who, with William Denning in England, developed the scientific visual study of meteors. He founded the American Meteor Society in 1911 and led the AMS for decades. He encouraged many young observers, including the discoverer, J. Montani || 
|-id=195
| 26195 Černohlávek || 1997 EN || Ivo Černohlávek (1960–1995) pioneered the Internet in the Czech Republic, cofounded the Czech academic network and helped to establish Brno as a center in information technology. A sportsman awarded the Fair Play prize for the rescue of a colleague on wild water, he died on a river in Norway. || 
|-id=197
| 26197 Bormio ||  || The town of Bormio in Italy. Bormio is a very ancient and pleasant village in the Rhaetian Alps, 200 kilometers from Milan. It hosts a biennial meeting on planetary sciences, and the name was suggested by A. Manara on the occasion of the fourth meeting in the series.Src/Src || 
|-id=199
| 26199 Aileenperry ||  || Aileen Perry mentored a finalist in the 2012 Intel Science Talent Search, a science competition for high-school seniors. || 
|-id=200
| 26200 Van Doren ||  || Benjamin Mark Van Doren (born 1994) is a finalist in the 2012 Intel Science Talent Search, a science competition for high-school seniors, for his animal-sciences project. || 
|}

26201–26300 

|-
| 26201 Sayonisaha ||  || Sayoni Saha (born 1994) is a finalist in the 2012 Intel Science Talent Search, a science competition for high-school seniors, for her behavioral and social-sciences project. || 
|-id=205
| 26205 Kuratowski ||  || Kazimierz Kuratowski (1896–1980), Polish mathematician || 
|-id=210
| 26210 Lingas ||  || Lingas plateau, in the Parc national des Cévennes (Cévennes National Park), site of the Observatoire des Pises || 
|-id=214
| 26214 Kalinga ||  || UNESCO's Kalinga Prize (bearing the old name of the Indian state of Orissa) || 
|-id=223
| 26223 Enari ||  || On 23 November 2001, Akihiko Enari (born 1980) became the first amateur radio operator (call sign JK1ZAM) in Japan to succeed in contacting the International Space Station in the course of the NASA program "Amateur Radio on the ISS" || 
|-id=232
| 26232 Antink ||  || Suzanne Antink mentored a finalist in the 2010 Intel Science Talent Search (STS), a science competition for high school seniors. She teaches at the Palo Alto Senior High School, Palo Alto, California || 
|-id=233
| 26233 Jimbraun ||  || Jim Braun mentored a finalist in the 2010 Intel Science Talent Search (STS), a science competition for high school seniors. He teaches at the Naperville Central High School, Naperville, Illinois || 
|-id=234
| 26234 Leslibrinson ||  || Leslie Brinson mentored a finalist in the 2010 Intel Science Talent Search (STS), a science competition for high school seniors. She teaches at the North Carolina School of Science & Mathematics, Durham, North Carolina || 
|-id=235
| 26235 Annemaduggan ||  || Annemarie Duggan mentored a finalist in the 2010 Intel Science Talent Search (STS), a science competition for high school seniors. She teaches at the Shrewsbury High School, Shrewsbury, Massachusetts || 
|-id=238
| 26238 Elduval ||  || Elizabeth Duval mentored a finalist in the 2010 Intel Science Talent Search (STS), a science competition for high school seniors. She teaches at the Montgomery Blair High School, Silver Spring, Maryland || 
|-id=240
| 26240 Leigheriks ||  || Leigh Eriks mentored a finalist in the 2010 Intel Science Talent Search (STS), a science competition for high school seniors. She teaches at the Catholic Central High School, Grand Rapids, Michigan || 
|-id=243
| 26243 Sallyfenska ||  || Sally Fenska mentored a finalist in the 2010 Intel Science Talent Search (STS), a science competition for high school seniors. She teaches at the Miami High School, Miami, Oklahoma || 
|-id=246
| 26246 Mikelake ||  || Michael Lake mentored a finalist in the 2010 Intel Science Talent Search (STS), a science competition for high school seniors. He teaches at the Half Hollow Hills High School West, Dix Hills, New York || 
|-id=247
| 26247 Doleonardi ||  || Donna Leonardi mentored a finalist in the 2010 Intel Science Talent Search (STS), a science competition for high school seniors. She teaches at the Academy for Medical Science Technology, Hackensack, New Jersey || 
|-id=248
| 26248 Longenecker ||  || Nevin Longenecker mentored a finalist in the 2010 Intel Science Talent Search (STS), a science competition for high school seniors. He teaches at the John Adams High School, South Bend, Indiana || 
|-id=250
| 26250 Shaneludwig ||  || Shane Ludwig mentored a finalist in the 2010 Intel Science Talent Search (STS), a science competition for high school seniors. He teaches at the Woodcrest Christian School, Riverside, California || 
|-id=251
| 26251 Kiranmanne ||  || Kiran Manne mentored a finalist in the 2010 Intel Science Talent Search (STS), a science competition for high school seniors. He teaches at the Albuquerque Academy, Albuquerque, New Mexico || 
|-id=252
| 26252 Chase ||  || David Chase (born 1943) is a member of Lowell Observatory's Advisory Board. As a diligent Board member, David gives generously of his time. He serves on Lowell Observatory's Foundation Board and two other committees. His talent helps Lowell Observatory full its mission. || 
|-id=255
| 26255 Carmarques ||  || Carlos Marques mentored a finalist in the 2010 Intel Science Talent Search (STS), a science competition for high school seniors. He teaches at the State University of New York College of Technology at Farmingdale || 
|-id=259
| 26259 Marzigliano ||  || Gerard Marzigliano mentored a finalist in the 2010 Intel Science Talent Search (STS), a science competition for high school seniors. He teaches at the Division Avenue High School, Levittown, New York || 
|-id=261
| 26261 Tinafreeman ||  || Tina Freeman (born 1955) has volunteered in the Lowell Observatory Archives since 2012. She has organized and cataloged the correspondence of Lowell Observatory historian William Graves Hoyt. || 
|-id=264
| 26264 McIntyre ||  || Nancy McIntyre mentored a finalist in the 2010 Intel Science Talent Search (STS), a science competition for high school seniors. She teaches at the Chaminade College Preparatory, West Hills, California || 
|-id=266
| 26266 Andrewmerrill ||  || Andrew Merrill mentored a finalist in the 2010 Intel Science Talent Search (STS), a science competition for high school seniors. He teaches at the Catlin Gabel School, Portland, Oregon || 
|-id=267
| 26267 Nickmorgan ||  || Nicholas Morgan mentored a finalist in the 2010 Intel Science Talent Search (STS), a science competition for high school seniors. He teaches at the Staples High School, Westport, Connecticut || 
|-id=268
| 26268 Nardi ||  || Patricia Nardi mentored a finalist in the 2010 Intel Science Talent Search (STS), a science competition for high school seniors. She teaches at the George W. Hewlett High School, Hewlett, New York || 
|-id=269
| 26269 Marciaprill ||  || Marcia Prill mentored a finalist in the 2010 Intel Science Talent Search (STS), a science competition for high school seniors. She teaches at the Madison High School, Madison, New Jersey || 
|-id=271
| 26271 Lindapuster ||  || Linda Puster mentored a finalist in the 2010 Intel Science Talent Search (STS), a science competition for high school seniors. She teaches at the Plano West Senior High School, Plano, Texas || 
|-id=273
| 26273 Kateschafer ||  || Katherine Schafer mentored a finalist in the 2010 Intel Science Talent Search (STS), a science competition for high school seniors. She teaches at the Harker School, San Jose, California || 
|-id=275
| 26275 Jefsoulier ||  || Jean Frančois Soulier (born 1966), a specialized educator and dedicated comet observer. || 
|-id=276
| 26276 Natrees ||  || Nathaniel Paul Rees, grandson of the discoverer || 
|-id=277
| 26277 Ianrees ||  || Ian Hudson Rees, grandson of the discoverer || 
|-id=282
| 26282 Noahbrosch ||  || Noah Brosch, (born 1948) is a Tel-Aviv University scientist broadly studying dwarf galaxies, Pluto, asteroids, comets, and meteors. he was the principle investigator of the TAUVEX space telescope initiative. Brosch served as the principal of the Wise observatory || 
|-id=283
| 26283 Oswalt ||  || Terry Oswalt (born 1952) is an American astronomer working in the fields of stellar and planetary astronomy. He has led or participated in observing campaigns for numerous occultations involving the Moon, planets and minor solar system bodies, including one of the first determinations of the size, shape, and density of 1 Ceres. || 
|-id=284
| 26284 Johnspahn ||  || John Spahn (born 1944) has volunteered at Lowell Observatory since 2012. He has helped with various projects in Development, Archives, the volunteer program and the business office, including donor research and the cataloging of books, glass plate negatives, and other artifacts. || 
|-id=285
| 26285 Lindaspahn ||  || Linda Spahn (born 1945) has volunteered at Lowell Observatory since 2012. She has helped with projects in the Archives, such as cataloging, and has also contributed her skills to gardening and beautifying the Lowell campus. || 
|-id=291
| 26291 Terristaples ||  || Terri Staples mentored a finalist in the 2010 Intel Science Talent Search (STS), a science competition for high school seniors. She teaches at the Red River High School, Grand Forks, North Dakota || 
|-id=293
| 26293 Van Muyden ||  || David Van Muyden mentored a finalist in the 2010 Intel Science Talent Search (STS), a science competition for high school seniors. He teaches at the Davis Senior High School, Davis, California || 
|-id=295
| 26295 Vilardi ||  || Virginia Vilardi mentored a finalist in the 2010 Intel Science Talent Search (STS), a science competition for high school seniors. She teaches at the Wetumpka High School, Wetumpka, Alabama || 
|-id=298
| 26298 Dunweathers ||  || Duncan Weathers mentored a finalist in the 2010 Intel Science Talent Search (STS), a science competition for high school seniors. He teaches at the Texas Academy of Mathematics & Science, Denton, Texas || 
|-id=300
| 26300 Herbweiss ||  || Herb Weiss mentored a finalist in the 2010 Intel Science Talent Search (STS), a science competition for high school seniors. He teaches at the South Side High School, Rockville Centre, New York || 
|}

26301–26400 

|-
| 26301 Hellawillis ||  || Hella Willis mentored a finalist in the 2010 Intel Science Talent Search (STS), a science competition for high school seniors. She teaches at the Sheboygan North High School, Sheboygan, Wisconsin || 
|-id=302
| 26302 Zimolzak ||  || Matt Zimolzak mentored a finalist in the 2010 Intel Science Talent Search (STS), a science competition for high school seniors. He teaches at the William Fremd High School, Palatine, Illinois || 
|-id=307
| 26307 Friedafein ||  || Frieda Rose Fein (born 1991) is a finalist in the 2010 Intel Science Talent Search (STS), a science competition for high school seniors, for her behavioral and social sciences project. She attends the John Adams High School, South Bend, Indiana || 
|-id=312
| 26312 Ciardi ||  || David Ciardi (born 1969) is an astronomer at the California Institute of Technology. His research interests include detection, validation and characterization of extrasolar planets, as well as characterization of young stellar objects. || 
|-id=313
| 26313 Lorilombardi ||  || Lori Lombardi (born 1955) has volunteered in the Lowell Observatory Archives since 2013. She has assisted with moving materials to the Putnam Collection Center and organizing and cataloging collections. || 
|-id=314
| 26314 Škvorecký ||  || Josef Škvorecký (1924–2012), Czech-Canadian writer and publisher of the post-World War II generation || 
|-id=319
| 26319 Miyauchi ||  || Miyauchi town is situated in the southern part of Nanyo city, Yamagata, Japan. || 
|-id=323
| 26323 Wuqijin ||  || Wu Qijin (born 1992) was awarded second place in the 2010 Intel International Science and Engineering Fair for her animal-sciences project. She attends the Fuzhou No. 1 Middle School, Fuzhou, Fujian, China || 
|-id=328
| 26328 Litomyšl || 1998 WQ || Litomyšl, a medieval town located in eastern Bohemia, Czech Republic. This traditional cultural center is known for its architectural monuments, including a Renaissance castle and a square surrounded by Renaissance and baroque houses. It is the birthplace of composer Bedřich Smetana and astronomer Zdeněk Kopal. || 
|-id=331
| 26331 Kondamuri ||  || Neil Kondamuri (born 1992) was awarded second place in the 2010 Intel International Science and Engineering Fair for his animal-sciences project. He attends the Munster High School, Munster, Indiana, U.S.A || 
|-id=332
| 26332 Alyssehrlich ||  || Alyssa Chelsea Ehrlich (born 1992) was awarded second place in the 2010 Intel International Science and Engineering Fair for her animal-sciences project. She attends the South Side High School, Rockville Centre, New York, U.S.A || 
|-id=333
| 26333 Joachim ||  || Gabriel Thailand Joachim (born 1993) was awarded best of category and first place in the 2010 Intel International Science and Engineering Fair for his animal-sciences project. He attends the Cibola High School, Albuquerque, New Mexico, U.S.A || 
|-id=334
| 26334 Melimcdowell ||  || Melissa Severn McDowell (born 1992) was awarded best of category and first place in the 2010 Intel International Science and Engineering Fair for her animal-sciences team project. She attends the Saint Joseph's Academy, Baton Rouge, Louisiana, U.S.A || 
|-id=336
| 26336 Mikemcdowell ||  || Michael Charles McDowell (born 1995) was awarded best of category and first place in the 2010 Intel International Science and Engineering Fair for his animal-sciences team project. He attends the Catholic High School, Baton Rouge, Louisiana, U.S.A || 
|-id=337
| 26337 Matthewagam ||  || Matthew Samuel Agam (born 1993) was awarded second place in the 2010 Intel International Science and Engineering Fair for his behavioral- and social-sciences project. He attends the Beaverton High School, Beaverton, Oregon, U.S.A || 
|-id=340
| 26340 Evamarková ||  || Eva Marková (born 1949), a Czech astronomer interested in solar astronomy who has led eight expeditions to observe total solar eclipses. Since 1986 she has served as director of the Úpice Observatory, where she is also engaged in astronomy education, including summer youth astronomy camps. || 
|-id=345
| 26345 Gedankien ||  || Tamara Gedankien (born 1992) was awarded best of category and first place in the 2010 Intel International Science and Engineering Fair for her behavioral- and social-sciences project. She attends the Escola Brasileira Israelita Chaim Nachman Bialik, São Paulo, Brazil || 
|-id=355
| 26355 Grueber ||  || Johann Grueber, (1623–1680) was a Jesuit priest, missionary, mathematician and astronomer at the Chinese imperial court from 1659 to 1661. He returned to Europe from China by the overland route and published the very first travelogue describing Tibet. || 
|-id=356
| 26356 Aventini ||  || Andrea Aventini (born 1952), Italian amateur astronomer at the Pistoia Mountains Astronomical Observatory || 
|-id=357
| 26357 Laguerre ||  || Edmond Laguerre (1834–1886), French mathematician || 
|-id=368
| 26368 Alghunaim ||  || Abdulaziz Khalid Alghunaim (born 1992) was awarded second place in the 2010 Intel International Science and Engineering Fair for his behavioral- and social-sciences project. He attends the Asrary School, Riyadh, Saudi Arabia || 
|-id=376
| 26376 Roborosa ||  || Róbert Rosa (1964–1994), a Slovak amateur astronomer and computer graphic designer who participated in the development of the graphic layout of the Slovak bimonthly journal Kozmos. He died in an accident at Fačkovské sedlo during the eleventh astronomy bike tour "Ebicykl" || 
|-id=382
| 26382 Charlieduke ||  || Charles Duke (born 1935) is a retired American astronaut, test pilot and U.S. Air Force officer. In 1972 he became the 10th and youngest person to walk on the Moon, serving as lunar module pilot for the Apollo 16 mission. || 
|-id=386
| 26386 Adelinacozma ||  || Adelina Corina Cozma (born 1995) was awarded second place in the 2010 Intel International Science and Engineering Fair for her behavioral- and social-sciences project. She attends the Bayview Secondary School, Richmond Hill, Ontario, Canada || 
|-id=389
| 26389 Poojarambhia ||  || Pooja Rambhia (born 1992) was awarded second place in the 2010 Intel International Science and Engineering Fair for her biochemistry project. She attends the Jericho High School, Jericho, New York, U.S.A || 
|-id=390
| 26390 Rušin ||  || Vojtech Rušin (born 1942), a Slovak solar physicist known for his contribution to dynamics of prominences and corona. He was one of the first observers at the Lomnický štít coronal station and greatly engaged in its further development. || 
|-id=393
| 26393 Scaffa ||  || Alejandro Mariano Scaffa (born 1992) was awarded best of category and first place in the 2010 Intel International Science and Engineering Fair for his biochemistry project. He attends the Escola Americana de Campinas, Campinas, São Paulo, Brazil || 
|-id=394
| 26394 Kandola ||  || Manjinder Singh Kandola (born 1992) was awarded second place in the 2010 Intel International Science and Engineering Fair for his biochemistry project. He attends the Queens High School for the Sciences at York College, Jamaica, New York, U.S.A || 
|-id=395
| 26395 Megkurohara ||  || Megan M. Kurohara (born 1993) was awarded second place in the 2010 Intel International Science and Engineering Fair for her biochemistry team project. She attends the Hilo High School, Hilo, Hawaii, U.S.A || 
|-id=396
| 26396 Chengjingjie ||  || Cheng Jingjie (born 1994) was awarded second place in the 2010 Intel International Science and Engineering Fair for her cellular- and molecular-biology project. She attends the Raffles Girls' School, Singapore || 
|-id=397
| 26397 Carolynsinow ||  || Carolyn Sinow (born 1992) was awarded first place in the 2010 Intel International Science and Engineering Fair for her cellular- and molecular-biology project. She attends the Palos Verdes Peninsula High School, Rolling Hills Estates, California, U.S.A || 
|-id=399
| 26399 Rileyennis ||  || Riley C. Ennis (born 1993) was awarded second place in the 2010 Intel International Science and Engineering Fair for his cellular- and molecular-biology project. He attends the Thomas Jefferson High School for Science and Technology, Alexandria, Virginia, U.S.A || 
|-id=400
| 26400 Roshanpalli ||  || Roshan Palli (born 1994) was awarded second place in the 2010 Intel International Science and Engineering Fair for his cellular- and molecular-biology team project. He attends the Paul Laurence Dunbar High School, Lexington, Kentucky, U.S.A || 
|}

26401–26500 

|-
| 26401 Sobotište || 1999 WX || Sobotište, a village in southwestern Slovakia, home of an astronomical observatory || 
|-id=411
| 26411 Jocorbferg ||  || Joseph Corbett Ferguson (born 1992) was awarded second place in the 2010 Intel International Science and Engineering Fair for his cellular- and molecular-biology team project. He currently works as a research scientist at NASA Ames Research Center || 
|-id=412
| 26412 Charlesyu ||  || Charles Cheng Yu (born 1994) was awarded first place in the 2010 Intel International Science and Engineering Fair for his cellular- and molecular-biology team project. He attends the Wheatley School, Old Westbury, New York, U.S.A || 
|-id=414
| 26414 Amychyao ||  || Amy Cindy Chyao (born 1994) was awarded best of category and first place in the 2010 Intel International Science and Engineering Fair for her chemistry project. She attends the Williams High School, Plano, Texas, U.S.A || 
|-id=417
| 26417 Michaelgord ||  || Michael Aaron Gord (born 1992) was awarded second place in the 2010 Intel International Science and Engineering Fair for his chemistry project. He attends the Dayton Christian High School, Miamisburg, Ohio, U.S.A || 
|-id=422
| 26422 Marekbuchman ||  || Marek Buchman (born 1993) was awarded second place in the 2010 Intel International Science and Engineering Fair for his chemistry project. He attends the School for Extraordinary Gifted Children, Bratislava, Slovakia || 
|-id=424
| 26424 Jacquelihung ||  || Hung Jacqueline (born 1991) was awarded first place in the 2010 Intel International Science and Engineering Fair for her chemistry team project. She attends the Taipei Municipal First Girls' Senior High School, Taipei City, Chinese Taipei || 
|-id=425
| 26425 Linchichieh ||  || Lin Chi-Chieh (born 1992) was awarded first place in the 2010 Intel International Science and Engineering Fair for her chemistry team project. She attends the Taipei Municipal First Girls' Senior High School, Taipei City, Chinese Taipei || 
|-id=426
| 26426 Koechl ||  || Juergen Koechl (born 1990) was awarded second place in the 2010 Intel International Science and Engineering Fair for his chemistry team project. He attends the HTL Braunau am Inn, Braunau am Inn, Austria || 
|-id=429
| 26429 Andiwagner ||  || Andreas Wagner (born 1990) was awarded second place in the 2010 Intel International Science and Engineering Fair for his chemistry team project. He attends the HTL Braunau am Inn, Braunau am Inn, Austria || 
|-id=430
| 26430 Thomwilkason ||  || Thomas Frederick Wilkason (born 1993) was awarded second place in the 2010 Intel International Science and Engineering Fair for his computer-science project. He attends the Mount de Sales Academy, Macon, Georgia, U.S.A || 
|-id=433
| 26433 Michaelyurko ||  || Michael Christopher Yurko (born 1993) was awarded second place in the 2010 Intel International Science and Engineering Fair for his computer-science project. He attends the Detroit Catholic Central High School, Novi, Michigan, U.S.A || 
|-id=435
| 26435 Juliebrisset ||  || Julie Brisset (born 1981) is a scientist at the Florida Space Institute-UCF (Orlando, FL). Her research focuses on the behavior of dust grains in microgravity conditions with applications to the structure of small body surfaces and rings in the solar system. || 
|-id=438
| 26438 Durling ||  || Susanne Durling (born 1934) is a long-time member of Lowell Observatory's Advisory Board. As a member of the Board Sue gives of her time and talent. She also serves on the Putnam Collection Center Committee, which advises on the preservation of Lowell's collection of artifacts. || 
|-id=441
| 26441 Nanayakkara ||  || Ganindu Nanayakkara (born 1990) was awarded first place in the 2010 Intel International Science and Engineering Fair for his computer-science project. He attends the Ananda College, Colombo, Sri Lanka || 
|-id=442
| 26442 Matfernandez ||  || Matthew Fernandez (born 1993) was awarded best of category and first place in the 2010 Intel International Science and Engineering Fair for his computer-science team project. He attends the Oregon Episcopal School, Portland, Oregon, U.S.A || 
|-id=447
| 26447 Akrishnan ||  || Akash Krishnan (born 1994) was awarded best of category and first place in the 2010 Intel International Science and Engineering Fair for his computer-science team project. He attends the Oregon Episcopal School, Portland, Oregon, U.S.A || 
|-id=448
| 26448 Tongjili ||  || Tongji Li (born 1992) was awarded second place in the 2010 Intel International Science and Engineering Fair for her earth-science project. She attends the Hershey High School, Hershey, Pennsylvania, U.S.A || 
|-id=450
| 26450 Tanyapetach ||  || Tanya Nicole Petach (born 1994) was awarded second place in the 2010 Intel International Science and Engineering Fair for her earth-science project. She attends the Fairview High School, Boulder, Colorado, U.S.A || 
|-id=451
| 26451 Khweis ||  || Majdolene Ziad Khweis (born 1993) was awarded best of category and first place in the 2010 Intel International Science and Engineering Fair for her earth-science project. She attends the Taos High School, Taos, New Mexico, U.S.A || 
|-id=455
| 26455 Priyamshah ||  || Priyam C. Shah (born 1992) was awarded first place in the 2010 Intel International Science and Engineering Fair for his earth-science team project. He attends the Sunset High School, Portland, Oregon, U.S.A || 
|-id=457
| 26457 Naomishah ||  || Naomi C. Shah (born 1995) was awarded first place in the 2010 Intel International Science and Engineering Fair for her earth-science team project. She attends the Sunset High School, Portland, Oregon, U.S.A || 
|-id=458
| 26458 Choihyuna ||  || Choi Hyun-A (born 1992) was awarded second place in the 2010 Intel International Science and Engineering Fair for her earth-science team project. She attends the Damyang High School, Damyang-gun, Jeollanam-do, South Korea || 
|-id=459
| 26459 Shinsubin ||  || Shin Subin (born 1992) was awarded second place in the 2010 Intel International Science and Engineering Fair for her earth-science team project. She attends the Damyang High School, Damyang-gun, Jeollanam-do, South Korea || 
|-id=462
| 26462 Albertcui ||  || Albert Cui (born 1991) was awarded second place in the 2010 Intel International Science and Engineering Fair for his electrical- and mechanical-engineering project. He attends the Hillcrest High School, Midvale, Utah, U.S.A || 
|-id=466
| 26466 Zarrin ||  || David Andrew Zarrin (born 1995) was awarded first place in the 2010 Intel International Science and Engineering Fair for his electrical- and mechanical-engineering project. He attends the Saratoga High School, Saratoga, California, U.S.A || 
|-id=467
| 26467 Jamespopper ||  || James Sinclair Popper (born 1992) was awarded best of category and first place in the 2010 Intel International Science and Engineering Fair for his electrical- and mechanical-engineering project. He attends the Marlborough College, Marlborough, Wiltshire, United Kingdom || 
|-id=468
| 26468 Ianchan ||  || Ian Chan (born 1991) was awarded second place in the 2010 Intel International Science and Engineering Fair for his electrical- and mechanical-engineering team project. He attends the Plano East Senior High School, Plano, Texas, U.S.A || 
|-id=471
| 26471 Tracybecker ||  || Tracy Michelle Becker (born 1986) determined the shapes of the components of asteroid , the first triple-asteroid system discovered in the near-Earth population. She did this work as a student working at the Arecibo Observatory, earning a Ph.D. in 2016. || 
|-id=474
| 26474 Davidsimon ||  || David Szabolcs Simon (born 1991) was awarded second place in the 2010 Intel International Science and Engineering Fair for his electrical- and mechanical-engineering team project. He attends the Szent Margit Secondary School, Budapest, Hungary || 
|-id=475
| 26475 Krisztisugar ||  || Krisztina Sugar (born 1991) was awarded second place in the 2010 Intel International Science and Engineering Fair for her electrical- and mechanical-engineering team project. She attends the Szent Margit Secondary School, Budapest, Hungary || 
|-id=478
| 26478 Cristianrosu ||  || Cristian Emilian Rosu (born 1991) was awarded first place in the 2010 Intel International Science and Engineering Fair for his electrical- and mechanical-engineering team project. He attends the Emanuil Gojdu National College, Oradea, Bihor, Romania || 
|-id=485
| 26485 Edwinpost ||  || Edwin Post (born 1953) is a member of Lowell Observatory's Advisory Board. Ed supports Lowell Observatory in its mission to bring astronomical research results to the general public. Ed is a software engineer who specializes in graphic design and animation. || 
|-id=488
| 26488 Beiser ||  || Antoinette S. Beiser (born 1956), Lowell Observatory's librarian for twenty years, now concentrates on fundraising || 
|-id=493
| 26493 Paulsucala ||  || Paul Stelian Sucala (born 1991) was awarded first place in the 2010 Intel International Science and Engineering Fair for his electrical- and mechanical-engineering team project. He attends the Silvania National College, Zalau, Rhode Island, U.S.A || 
|-id=495
| 26495 Eichorn ||  || Will Eichorn (born 1943), an amateur astronomer and retired Dow Chemical optical technician, living in Bay City, Michigan. || 
|-id=498
| 26498 Dinotina ||  || Dino and Tina Grifoni, uncle and aunt of Italian astronomer Andrea Boattini who co-discovered this minor planet || 
|-id=500
| 26500 Toshiohino ||  || Toshio Hino (born 1950), Japanese astronomer || 
|}

26501–26600 

|-
| 26501 Sachiko ||  || Sachiko Nagata, teacher of Oshibana, the Japanese art of arranging pressed flowers || 
|-id=502
| 26502 Traviscole ||  || Travis Cole Sylvester (born 1993) was awarded second place in the 2010 Intel International Science and Engineering Fair for his environmental-management project. He attends the Greybull High School, Greybull, Wyoming, U.S.A || 
|-id=503
| 26503 Avicramer ||  || Avilash Kalpathy Cramer (born 1993) was awarded best of category and first place in the 2010 Intel International Science and Engineering Fair for his environmental-management project. He attends the West Linn High School, West Linn, Oregon, U.S.A || 
|-id=504
| 26504 Brandonli ||  || Brandon Li (born 1992) was awarded second place in the 2010 Intel International Science and Engineering Fair for his environmental-management project. He attends the Jericho High School, Jericho, New York, U.S.A || 
|-id=505
| 26505 Olextokarev ||  || Olexandr Tokarev (born 1993) was awarded second place in the 2010 Intel International Science and Engineering Fair for his environmental-management project. He attends the Chemical Ecological Lyceum, Dnipropetrovsk, Ukraine || 
|-id=507
| 26507 Mikelin ||  || Michael Lin (born 1993) was awarded second place in the 2010 Intel International Science and Engineering Fair for his environmental-management team project. He attends the Robert Louis Stevenson Upper School, Pebble Beach, California, U.S.A || 
|-id=508
| 26508 Jimmylin ||  || Jimmy Lin (born 1994) was awarded second place in the 2010 Intel International Science and Engineering Fair for his environmental-management team project. He attends the Robert Louis Stevenson Upper School, Pebble Beach, California, U.S.A || 
|-id=513
| 26513 Newberry ||  || William Cummings Newberry (born 1991) was awarded first place in the 2010 Intel International Science and Engineering Fair for his materials-and-bioengineering project. He attends the Greenwich High School, Greenwich, Connecticut, U.S.A || 
|-id=518
| 26518 Bhuiyan ||  || Mubarrat Nuvid Bhuiyan (born 1992) was awarded second place in the 2010 Intel International Science and Engineering Fair for her materials-and-bioengineering project. She attends the Jericho High School, Jericho, New York, U.S.A || 
|-id=522
| 26522 Juliapoje ||  || Julia Elizabeth Poje (born 1992) was awarded second place in the 2010 Intel International Science and Engineering Fair for her materials-and-bioengineering project. She attends the Valley Stream South High School, Valley Stream, New York, U.S.A || 
|-id=526
| 26526 Jookayhyun ||  || Joo Kay Hyun (born 1992) was awarded best of category and first place in the 2010 Intel International Science and Engineering Fair for her materials-and-bioengineering project. She attends the Changduk Girls High School, Seoul, South Korea || 
|-id=527
| 26527 Leasure ||  || Audrey Christine Leasure (born 1993) was awarded first place in the 2010 Intel International Science and Engineering Fair for her materials-and-bioengineering team project. She attends the Lake Highland Preparatory School, Orlando, Florida, U.S.A || 
|-id=528
| 26528 Genniferubin ||  || Gennifer Reid Rubin (born 1992) was awarded first place in the 2010 Intel International Science and Engineering Fair for her materials-and-bioengineering team project. She attends the Lake Highland Preparatory School, Orlando, Florida, U.S.A || 
|-id=530
| 26530 Lucferreira ||  || Lucas Strasburg Ferreira (born 1991) was awarded second place in the 2010 Intel International Science and Engineering Fair for his materials-and-bioengineering team project. He attends the Fundacao Escola Tecnica Liberato Salzano Vieira da Cunha, Novo Hamburgo, Rio Grande do Sul, Brazil || 
|-id=532
| 26532 Eduardoboff ||  || Eduardo Trierweiler Boff (born 1991) was awarded second place in the 2010 Intel International Science and Engineering Fair for his materials-and-bioengineering team project. He attends the Fundacao Escola Tecnica Liberato Salzano Vieira da Cunha, Novo Hamburgo, Rio Grande do Sul, Brazil || 
|-id=533
| 26533 Aldering ||  || Greg Aldering (born 1962), a member of Supernova Cosmology Project studying the use of Type Ia supernovae for determining cosmological parameters. || 
|-id=537
| 26537 Shyamalbuch ||  || Shyamal Buch (born 1995) was awarded best of category and first place in the 2010 Intel International Science and Engineering Fair for his energy-and-transportation project. He attends the Vista del Lago High School, Folsom, California, U.S.A || 
|-id=541
| 26541 Garyross ||  || Gary Ross (born 1945) has served on the executive board of the Grand Rapids Astronomical Society and Warren Astronomical Society in southern Michigan. He has also been instrumental in the operation of the James C. Veen observatory in Lowell, Michigan, for over 40 years. || 
|-id=544
| 26544 Ajjarapu ||  || Avanthi Sai Ajjarapu (born 1993) was awarded second place in the 2010 Intel International Science and Engineering Fair for her energy-and-transportation project. She attends the Ames High School, Ames, Iowa, U.S.A || 
|-id=545
| 26545 Meganperkins ||  || Megan Lynn Perkins (born 1994) was awarded first place in the 2010 Intel International Science and Engineering Fair for her energy-and-transportation project. She attends the duPont Manual High School, Louisville, Kentucky, U.S.A || 
|-id=546
| 26546 Arulmani ||  || Dheevesh Arulmani (born 1995) was awarded second place in the 2010 Intel International Science and Engineering Fair for his energy-and-transportation project. He attends the Gordon Graydon Memorial Secondary School, Mississauga, Ontario, Canada || 
|-id=548
| 26548 Joykutty ||  || Anna Maria Joykutty (born 1993) was awarded second place in the 2010 Intel International Science and Engineering Fair for her energy-and-transportation project. She attends the American Heritage School, Plantation, Florida, U.S.A || 
|-id=549
| 26549 Tankanran ||  || Tan Kan-Ran (born 1992) was awarded second place in the 2010 Intel International Science and Engineering Fair for his energy-and-transportation team project. He attends the Beijing No. 4 High School, Beijing, China || 
|-id=551
| 26551 Shenliangbo ||  || Shen Liang-Bo (born 1993) was awarded second place in the 2010 Intel International Science and Engineering Fair for his energy-and-transportation team project. He attends the Beijing No. 4 High School, Beijing, China || 
|-id=557
| 26557 Aakritijain ||  || Aakriti Jain (born 1992) was awarded second place in the 2010 Intel International Science and Engineering Fair for her energy-and-transportation team project. She attends the Lynbrook High School, San Jose, California, U.S.A || 
|-id=559
| 26559 Chengcheng ||  || Cheng Cheng (born 1992) was awarded second place in the 2010 Intel International Science and Engineering Fair for her energy-and-transportation team project. She attends the Lynbrook High School, San Jose, California, U.S.A || 
|-id=575
| 26575 Andreapugh ||  || Andrea Aleah Pugh (born 1994) was awarded second place in the 2010 Intel International Science and Engineering Fair for her environmental-science project. She attends the Saginaw Arts and Sciences Academy, Saginaw, Michigan, U.S.A || 
|-id=578
| 26578 Cellinekim ||  || Celline Kim (born 1992) was awarded best of category and first place in the 2010 Intel International Science and Engineering Fair for her environmental-science project. She attends the Manhasset High School, Manhasset, New York, U.S.A || 
|-id=586
| 26586 Harshaw ||  || Richard Harshaw (born 1951) is an Arizona amateur astronomer who makes measurements of double stars. He has served in numerous official positions with astronomy clubs || 
|-id=587
| 26587 Arthurstorbo ||  || Arthur Storbo (born 1944) is a member of Lowell Observatory's Advisory Board. Art and his wife Sharon give of their time and talent to help Lowell Observatory fulfill its mission. Art is also a member of the Director's Opportunity Network, seeking to create new opportunities. || 
|-id=588
| 26588 Sharonstorbo ||  || Sharon Storbo (born 1950) is a member of Lowell Observatory's Advisory Board. Sharon and her husband Art give generously of their time and talent helping Lowell Observatory fulfill its mission. || 
|-id=591
| 26591 Robertreeves ||  || Robert Reeves (born 1946) is the author of several books on digital astronomical imaging and of numerous popular articles on various topics in astronomy and space science || 
|-id=592
| 26592 Maryrenfro ||  || Mary Renfro Reeves (born 1957) is a physical therapist in San Antonio, Texas || 
|-id=593
| 26593 Perrypat ||  || Perry Remaklus (born 1939) and Patricia Remaklus (born 1941), the founders, owners, and operators of the Willmann-Bell astronomy book publishing firm and long-time members of the Springfield Telescope Makers. || 
|}

26601–26700 

|-id=604
| 26604 Ensign ||  || Thomas Ensign (born 1943) is a long-time member of the Lowell Advisory Board. Tom is a member of the Executive Committee and the Chair of the Marketing and Public Relations Committee. He supports Lowell's mission and Lowell's science camp for kids. || 
|-id=605
| 26605 Hanley ||  || Jennifer Hanley (born 1984) is a tenure-track astronomer at Lowell Observatory. Her research interests involve the stability and spectral properties of ices at low pressures with relevance to the outer solar system, especially Titan and Pluto. || 
|-id=611
| 26611 Madzlandon ||  || Madeline Maley Landon (born 1993) was awarded second place in the 2010 Intel International Science and Engineering Fair for her environmental-science project. She attends the Friendswood High School, Friendswood, Texas, U.S.A || 
|-id=612
| 26612 Sunsetastro ||  || Founded in 1975, the Sunset Astronomical Society serves the Saginaw-Bay City-Midland tri-cities area of mid-Michigan. || 
|-id=618
| 26618 Yixinli ||  || Yixin Li (born 1993) was awarded first place in the 2010 Intel International Science and Engineering Fair for her environmental-science team project. She attends the Ballard High School, Louisville, Kentucky, U.S.A || 
|-id=620
| 26620 Yihuali ||  || Yihua Li (born 1993) was awarded first place in the 2010 Intel International Science and Engineering Fair for her environmental-science team project. She attends the Ballard High School, Louisville, Kentucky, U.S.A || 
|-id=622
| 26622 Maxwimberley ||  || Maxim Ilya Wimberley (born 1992) was awarded second place in the 2010 Intel International Science and Engineering Fair for his mathematical-sciences project. He attends the Liberal Arts and Science Academy, Austin, Texas, U.S.A || 
|-id=629
| 26629 Zahller ||  || Cordelia Zahller Luginbuhl (the discoverer's mother), and the Zahller family || 
|-id=634
| 26634 Balasubramanian ||  || Anirudha Balasubramanian (born 1992) was awarded second place in the 2010 Intel International Science and Engineering Fair for his mathematical-sciences project. He attends the Saint Albans School, Washington, D.C., U.S.A || 
|-id=636
| 26636 Ericabroman ||  || Erica A. Broman (born 1959) is the Trustee Designate for Lowell Observatory and is the great-grandniece of Percival Lowell. Erica is a long-time member of Lowell Observatory's Advisory Board and the current Vice President for Institutional Advancement of Westfield State University. || 
|-id=639
| 26639 Murgaš ||  || Jozef Murgaš (1864–1929), Slovak inventor, architect, botanist, painter, patriot, and Roman Catholic priest || 
|-id=640
| 26640 Bahýľ ||  || Ján Bahýľ (1856–1916), Slovak engineer and aeronautical pioneer who was one of the early inventors of the helicopter || 
|-id=642
| 26642 Schlenoff ||  || Philip Samuel Schlenoff (born 1992) was awarded second place in the 2010 Intel International Science and Engineering Fair for his medicine and health-sciences project. He attends the Maclay School, Tallahassee, Florida, U.S.A || 
|-id=652
| 26652 Klinglesmith ||  || Daniel A. Klinglesmith III (1939–2019) was an American astrophysicist and photometrist from Indiana University who has devoted himself to both youth science education and asteroid rotation studies at Etscorn Observatory  of New Mexico Tech, a site of the asteroid-oriented Summer Science Program (Src, AAS). || 
|-id=653
| 26653 Amymeyer ||  || Amy Elizabeth Meyer (born 1992) was awarded second place in the 2010 Intel International Science and Engineering Fair for her medicine and health-sciences project. She attends the Oakville Senior High School, St. Louis, Missouri, U.S.A || 
|-id=654
| 26654 Ericjohnson ||  || Eric Johnson (born 1963) is a member of Lowell Observatory's Advisory Board and is helping Lowell fulfill its mission. Eric serves on Lowell's Technology Committee and donated a 17-inch CDK Telescope to the Giovale Open Deck Observatory for the benefit of the general public. || 
|-id=656
| 26656 Samarenae ||  || Samantha Renae Prabakaran (born 1996) was awarded second place in the 2010 Intel International Science and Engineering Fair for her medicine and health-sciences project. She attends the Fort Myers High School, Fort Myers, Florida, U.S.A || 
|-id=659
| 26659 Skirda ||  || Olga Y. Skirda (born 1992) was awarded second place in the 2010 Intel International Science and Engineering Fair for her medicine and health-sciences project. She attends the Health Careers High School, San Antonio, Texas, U.S.A || 
|-id=660
| 26660 Samahalpern ||  || Samantha Brooke Halpern (born 1993) was awarded second place in the 2010 Intel International Science and Engineering Fair for her medicine and health-sciences project. She attends the Roslyn High School, Roslyn Heights, New York, U.S.A || 
|-id=661
| 26661 Kempelen ||  || Wolfgang von Kempelen (1734–1804), Hungarian polymath, mechanic and inventor || 
|-id=664
| 26664 Jongwon ||  || Jong Hyuck Won (born 1992) was awarded best of category and first place in the 2010 Intel International Science and Engineering Fair for his medicine and health-sciences project. He attends the Langley High School, McLean, Virginia, U.S.A || 
|-id=665
| 26665 Sidjena ||  || Siddhartha Gautama Jena (born 1994) was awarded first place in the 2010 Intel International Science and Engineering Fair for his medicine and health-sciences project. He attends the International Academy, Bloomfield Hills, Michigan, U.S.A || 
|-id=666
| 26666 Justinto ||  || Justin To (born 1992) was awarded first place in the 2010 Intel International Science and Engineering Fair for his medicine and health-sciences project. He attends the Oak Grove High School, San Jose, California, U.S.A || 
|-id=667
| 26667 Sherwinwu ||  || Sherwin Zhang Wu (born 1992) was awarded second place in the 2010 Intel International Science and Engineering Fair for his medicine and health-sciences project. He attends the Detroit Country Day School, Beverly Hills, Michigan, U.S.A || 
|-id=668
| 26668 Tonyho ||  || Tony Ho (born 1992) was awarded second place in the 2010 Intel International Science and Engineering Fair for his medicine and health-sciences team project. He attends the Lynbrook High School, San Jose, California, U.S.A || 
|-id=671
| 26671 Williamlopes ||  || William Lopes (born 1989) was awarded second place in the 2010 Intel International Science and Engineering Fair for his microbiology project. He attends the Fundacao Escola Tecnica Liberato Salzano Vieira da Cunha, Novo Hamburgo, Rio Grande do Sul, Brazil || 
|-id=672
| 26672 Ericabrooke ||  || Erica Brooke Portnoy (born 1993) was awarded first place in the 2010 Intel International Science and Engineering Fair for her microbiology project. She attends the Commack High School, Commack, New York, U.S.A || 
|-id=678
| 26678 Garner ||  || Robert B. Garner (born 1954) is a member of Lowell Observatory's Advisory Board. As a member of the Board, Robert helps Lowell Observatory fulfill its mission. || 
|-id=679
| 26679 Thomassilver ||  || Thomas Scott Silver (born 1993) was awarded best of category and first place in the 2010 Intel International Science and Engineering Fair for his microbiology project. He attends the Bergen Academy for Medical Science and Technology, Hackensack, New Jersey, U.S.A || 
|-id=680
| 26680 Wangchristi ||  || Wang Kun Christina (born 1992) was awarded second place in the 2010 Intel International Science and Engineering Fair for her microbiology project. She attends the Shanghai American School, Shanghai, China || 
|-id=681
| 26681 Niezgay ||  || Augusto German Niez Gay (born 1993) was awarded second place in the 2010 Intel International Science and Engineering Fair for his microbiology project. He attends the Instituto San Jose Adoratrices, Concordia, Entre Rios, Argentina || 
|-id=682
| 26682 Evanfletcher ||  || Evan Haley Fletcher (born 1992) was awarded second place in the 2010 Intel International Science and Engineering Fair for his physics-and-astronomy project. He attends the Kalamazoo Area Mathematics and Science Center, Kalamazoo, Michigan, U.S.A || 
|-id=683
| 26683 Jamesmccarthy ||  || James P. McCarthy (born 1935) is a founding member of Lowell Observatory's Advisory Board, who offers his time and talent to Lowell Observatory in honor of late Trustee William "Bill" Putnam. James is a member of the American Alpine Club and is passionate about education and outreach. || 
|-id=685
| 26685 Khojandi ||  || Aryan Iden Khojandi (born 1991) was awarded second place in the 2010 Intel International Science and Engineering Fair for his physics-and-astronomy project. He attends the Thomas Jefferson High School for Science and Technology, Alexandria, Virginia, U.S.A || 
|-id=686
| 26686 Ellenprice ||  || Ellen Marie Price (born 1992) was awarded second place in the 2010 Intel International Science and Engineering Fair for her physics-and-astronomy project. She attends the Jefferson County International Baccalaureate School, Birmingham, Alabama, U.S.A || 
|-id=688
| 26688 Wangenevieve ||  || Genevieve Ying Wang (born 1992) was awarded second place in the 2010 Intel International Science and Engineering Fair for her physics-and-astronomy team project. She attends the Grosse Pointe South High School, Grosse Pointe Farms, Michigan, U.S.A || 
|-id=689
| 26689 Smorrison ||  || Stephen J. Morrison (born 1993) was awarded second place in the 2010 Intel International Science and Engineering Fair for his physics-and-astronomy team project. He attends the Grosse Pointe North High School, Grosse Pointe Woods, Michigan, U.S.A || 
|-id=691
| 26691 Lareegardner ||  || Laree Danielle Gardner (born 1992) was awarded second place in the 2010 Intel International Science and Engineering Fair for her physics-and-astronomy team project. She attends the Grosse Pointe North High School, Grosse Pointe Woods, Michigan, U.S.A || 
|-id=693
| 26693 Katharinecorbin ||  || Katharine "Kay" Corbin (born 1944) is a member of Lowell Observatory's Advisory Board and is the great grand-niece of Percival Lowell. Kay is a member of Lowell's Executive Committee and Investment Committee. Kay has a science degree from Harvard University. || 
|-id=694
| 26694 Wenxili ||  || Wenxi Li (born 1993) was awarded second place in the 2010 Intel International Science and Engineering Fair for her plant-sciences project. She attends the Thomas Chilton Jasper High School, Plano, Texas, U.S.A || 
|-id=696
| 26696 Gechenzhang ||  || Gechen Zhang (born 1992) was awarded second place in the 2010 Intel International Science and Engineering Fair for his plant-sciences project. He attends the Rockwood Summit High School, Fenton, Missouri, U.S.A || 
|-id=698
| 26698 Maryschroeder ||  || Mary M. Schroeder (born 1942) is a long-time member of Lowell Observatory's Advisory Board. Mary is a supporter of the LOCKs program, which offers science camps for elementary school children. || 
|-id=699
| 26699 Masoncole ||  || Mason Cole McFarland (born 1992) was awarded best of category and first place in the 2010 Intel International Science and Engineering Fair for his plant-sciences project. He attends the Jefferson County International Baccalaureate School, Birmingham, Alabama, U.S.A || 
|}

26701–26800 

|-id=702
| 26702 Naber ||  || Thomas Naber (born 1959) is a member of Lowell Observatory's Advisory Board. Tom supports Lowell Observatory as a member of Lowell Observatory's Investment Committee. || 
|-id=703
| 26703 Price ||  || David R. Price (born 1962) is a member of Lowell Observatory's Advisory Board who helps Lowell fulfill its mission statement to "maintain quality public education and outreach programs." David supports Lowell Observatory's Native American Astronomy Outreach Program. || 
|-id=707
| 26707 Navrazhnykh ||  || Luizetta Vadimovna Navrazhnykh (born 1994) was awarded second place in the 2010 Intel International Science and Engineering Fair for her plant-sciences project. She attends the Florida Atlantic University High School, Boca Raton, Florida, U.S.A || 
|-id=711
| 26711 Rebekahbau ||  || Rebekah Bau (born 1993) was awarded second place in the 2010 Intel International Science and Engineering Fair for her plant-sciences team project. She attends the Cedar Shoals High School, Athens, Georgia, U.S.A || 
|-id=712
| 26712 Stewart ||  || Paul C. Stewart (born 1961) is a member of Lowell Observatory's Advisory Board. As a member of the Board, Paul has given of his time and talent to help Lowell Observatory fulfill its mission. Paul is Director of Technology for Space Dynamics Laboratory. || 
|-id=713
| 26713 Iusukyin || 2001 GR || Iu Suk-yin (born 1932), a passionate school teacher who gave lifetime support to her husband Joseph Liu, the founder of the Hong Kong Space Museum and the "Father of Amateur Astronomy" in Hong Kong. || 
|-id=715
| 26715 South Dakota || 2001 HJ || South Dakota, where the discovery site, the Badlands Observatory, is situated || 
|-id=717
| 26717 Jasonye ||  || Jason Ye (born 1993) was awarded second place in the 2010 Intel International Science and Engineering Fair for his plant-sciences team project. He attends the Cedar Shoals High School, Athens, Georgia, U.S.A || 
|-id=720
| 26720 Yangxinyan ||  || Yang Xinyan (born 1992) was awarded second place in the 2010 Intel International Science and Engineering Fair for her biochemistry team project. She attends the No. 7 High School of Chengdu City, Chengdu, Sichuan, China || 
|-id=727
| 26727 Wujunjun ||  || Wu Junjun (born 1992) was awarded second place in the 2010 Intel International Science and Engineering Fair for his biochemistry team project. He attends the No. 7 High School of Chengdu City, Chengdu, Sichuan, China || 
|-id=728
| 26728 Luwenqi ||  || Lu Wenqi (born 1992) was awarded second place in the 2010 Intel International Science and Engineering Fair for her biochemistry team project. She attends the No. 7 High School of Chengdu City, Chengdu, Sichuan, China || 
|-id=732
| 26732 Damianpeach ||  || Damian Peach (born 1978) is a British planetary observer and core member of the British Astronomical Association who makes tremendous contributions to planetary imaging and promoted amateur-professional collaboration. His outstanding planetary images have been published in astronomical and scientific publications. || 
|-id=733
| 26733 Nanavisitor ||  || Nana Visitor (Nana Tucker), American actress † || 
|-id=734
| 26734 Terryfarrell ||  || Terry Farrell (Theresa Lee Farrell), American actress † || 
|-id=736
| 26736 Rojeski ||  || Hannah Rojeski (born 1993) was awarded second place in the 2010 Intel International Science and Engineering Fair for her biochemistry team project. She attends the Hilo High School, Hilo, Hawaii, U.S.A || 
|-id=737
| 26737 Adambradley ||  || Adam Bradley Halverson (born 1991) was awarded second place in the 2010 Intel International Science and Engineering Fair for his electrical- and mechanical-engineering project. He attends the Garretson High School, Garretson, South Dakota, U.S.A || 
|-id=738
| 26738 Lishizhen ||  || Li Shizhen (1518–1593) was a Chinese herbalist. It took him 28 years to complete his Bencao Gangmu (Compendium of Materia Medica), with details of 1800 drugs || 
|-id=739
| 26739 Hemaeberhart ||  || Heather Marie Eberhart (born 1992) was awarded second place in the 2010 Intel International Science and Engineering Fair for her environmental-management project. She attends the Bellarmine Preparatory School, Tacoma, Washington, U.S.A || 
|-id=740
| 26740 Camacho ||  || Martin Ayalde Camacho (born 1995) was awarded first place in the 2010 Intel International Science and Engineering Fair for his mathematical-sciences project. He attends the Central High School, Saint Paul, Minnesota, U.S.A || 
|-id=743
| 26743 Laichinglung ||  || Lai Ching Lung (born 1948) is a Hong Kong medical physician and a leading liver specialist. He has been a Professor of Medicine and Hepatology at the University of Hong Kong since 2003, where he has trained many physicians. || 
|-id=744
| 26744 Marthahaynes ||  || Martha P. Haynes (born 1951) is an American astronomer at Cornell University who has used radio, infrared, optical, and ultraviolet observations to probe the formation, evolution and content of galaxies and clusters. She has been a leader in the ALFALFA survey and the forthcoming CCAT-prime wide-field submillimeter telescope. || 
|-id=745
| 26745 Szeglin ||  || Arthur R. Szeglin (born 1935) is a long-time member of Lowell Observatory's Advisory Board. || 
|-id=748
| 26748 Targovnik ||  || Selma Targovnik (born 1936) is a long-time member of Lowell Observatory's Advisory Board. She retired from her dermatology practice where she served helping members of the U.S. military. Selma gives selflessly of her time and talent to Lowell Observatory and to her dance group. || 
|-id=757
| 26757 Bastei ||  || The Bastei, a 193 m rock in the middle of the Elbsandsteingebirge (eastern Germany's "Saxon Switzerland"), rising above the Elbe river || 
|-id=761
| 26761 Stromboli || 2033 P-L || Stromboli island and volcano || 
|-id=763
| 26763 Peirithoos || 2706 P-L || Peirithoos, mythological friend of Theseus and father of the Greek hero Polypoites || 
|-id=793
| 26793 Bolshoi ||  || Located in the center of Moscow, the Bolshoi Theater of opera and ballet is the largest in Russia and one of the most significant in the world. Its history began in 1776, when the province procurator prince Petr Vasil'evich Urusov received the decree of Catherine II and started building the theater || 
|-id=794
| 26794 Yukioniimi ||  || Niimi Yukio (born 1937) analyzed the relation between the coordinate system of the Fourth Fundamental Catalog (FK4) and that of the Planetary Dynamical Theory (DE200, VSOP82) with modern observations of planets. His result obtained from Mars observations was used by Fricke to determine the correction to the FK4 Equinox. || 
|-id=795
| 26795 Basilashvili ||  || Oleg Valerianovich Basilashvili (born 1934) has been honored as a People's Artist of the USSR and a state prize laureate of Russia along with many other domestic and foreign prizes, including an Honorable Citizen of St. Petersburg. || 
|-id=800
| 26800 Gualtierotrucco ||  || Gualtiero Trucco (born 1953) is a cardiologist specializing in arrhythmology. || 
|}

26801–26900 

|-id=806
| 26806 Kushiike ||  || Kushiike was the old village (now part of Joetsu city, Niigata prefecture, Japan) known for the meteorite that fell on 1920 Sept. 16. A public astronomical observatory was built in commemoration of the meteorite and has become a center for education and astronomy outreach in the southern Niigata area. || 
|-id=811
| 26811 Hiesinger || 1985 QP || Harald Hiesinger (born 1964), a planetary geologist at the Westfälische Wilhelms-Universität in Münster, Germany. || 
|-id=821
| 26821 Baehr ||  || George Baehr (1666–1738) was a famous architect of the German Baroque period. His masterpiece, the Dresden Frauenkirche, is a centrally planned monumental Protestant church provided with a massive stone dome. This city landmark was destroyed in 1945 and is now being rebuilt. || 
|-id=829
| 26829 Sakaihoikuen ||  || Kindergarten Sakaihoikuen, Musashino City, Tokyo, Japan || 
|-id=837
| 26837 Yoshitakaokazaki ||  || Yoshitaka Okazaki (born 1967) is a teacher at Tosajuku Junior and Senior High School in Kochi city. He enjoys astrophotography as a hobby and is also involved in astronomy education for children as an instructor at Geisei Observatory. || 
|-id=842
| 26842 Hefele ||  || Herbert Hefele (born 1942), German astronomer, editor of the Astronomy & Astrophysics Abstracts, and librarian of the Astronomisches Rechen-Institut (ARI). The name was suggested by the first discoverer, Lutz Schmadel. || 
|-id=849
| 26849 De Paepe ||  || Hugo de Paepe (born 1940), a doctor of medicine and a specialist in orthopaedic surgery. || 
|-id=851
| 26851 Sarapul ||  || Sarapul, Russia, on the Kama river || 
|-id=857
| 26857 Veracruz ||  || Veracruz is a major port on the Gulf of Mexico, founded in 1519 by the Spanish explorer Hernán Cortés. In 1769 French astronomer Chappe d´Auteroche, on his way to San José, suffered great difficulty in reaching the port by boat, due to extremely heavy stormy weather, a phenomenon typical for this region in the Mexican Gulf. || 
|-id=858
| 26858 Misterrogers || 1993 FR || Fred Rogers (1928–2003) was a passionate advocate for children who taught that everyone is unique and deserving of love and respect "just the way you are". For more than 30 years he used his public television program Mister Rogers' Neighborhood as a vehicle of service to the youngest members of the human family. || 
|-id=871
| 26871 Tanezrouft ||  || The Tanezrouft Basin, a part of the Sahara Desert, lies just above the Tropic of Cancer, about 750 miles south of Algiers. An especially parched land with annual rainfall less than 0.2 inches, it is hyperarid, with very high temperatures and scarcity of vegetation. There are no permanent residents here, only occasional Tuareg people. || 
|-id=879
| 26879 Haines ||  || Peter Wyatt Haines (born 1960), an Australian geologist and discoverer of several impact craters in Australia. He is an associate professor of geology with the University of Tasmania, and has worked in the field of impact geology for a number of years. He discovered the Goyder and Foelsche impact structures in Northern Territory with strong geological, structural and geophysical evidence. || 
|-id=883
| 26883 Marcelproust ||  || Marcel Proust (1871–1922) was a French novelist and essayist, widely considered to be one of the most influential author of the 20th century. His monumental novel Á la recherche du temps perdu was published in seven volumes between 1913 and 1927, the last three volumes being edited by his brother, Robert. || 
|-id=887
| 26887 Tokyogiants ||  || Tokyo Yomiuri Giants baseball team || 
|-id=891
| 26891 Johnbutler ||  || Christopher John Butler (born 1940), Irish astronomer who has worked on cool stars, the effects of solar variability on climate, and preserving Armagh Observatory's scientific heritage for future generations. He is well known for his active involvement in the community of Armagh and for discovering an exceptional flare on HD 6090 ("Butler's star"). || 
|-id=896
| 26896 Josefhudec || 1995 OY || Josef Hudec (1895–1972), a Czech amateur astronomer who made visual observations and drawings of the solar photosphere and was a keen popularizer of astronomy. He built a public observatory in the town of Kroměříž during the last three years of his life. The name was suggested by J. Koukal. || 
|-id=897
| 26897 Červená || 1995 PJ || Soňa Červená (born 1925), a Czech opera singer, made her debut in Brno and moved to Berlin in 1958. She performed in prestigious opera houses in Europe, the Americas, finally returning to Prague, where she is still active in theater productions. || 
|}

26901–27000 

|-id=906
| 26906 Rubidia ||  || Rubidia Mendez-Harris (born 1945), Guatemalto-American widow of David L. Harris, a member of the discovery team || 
|-id=908
| 26908 Lebesgue || 1996 GK || Henri Lebesgue (1875–1941), French mathematician known for his Lebesgue integration || 
|-id=909
| 26909 Lefschetz ||  || Solomon Lefschetz (1884–1972), American mathematician and expert on non-linear differential equations and control theory || 
|-id=917
| 26917 Pianoro ||  || Pianoro, Italy, location of Pianoro Observatory (Osservatorio Astronomico di Pianoro) || 
|-id=919
| 26919 Shoichimiyata ||  || Shoichi Miyata (born 1948), a member of the Yamagata Astronomical Society. || 
|-id=921
| 26921 Jensallit ||  || Jennifer Sallit, wife of British astronomer George C. Sallit who discovered this minor planet || 
|-id=922
| 26922 Samara ||  || The Samara river, flowing from the foothills of the Urals to join the Volga at the city of Samara || 
|-id=924
| 26924 Johnharvey ||  || John Warren Harvey (born 1940), American heliologist || 
|-id=934
| 26934 Jordancotler ||  || Jordan Saul Cotler (born 1994) is a finalist in the 2012 Intel Science Talent Search, a science competition for high-school seniors, for his physics and space-science project. || 
|-id=935
| 26935 Vireday ||  || Carol Claire Vireday (born 1957), wife of American astronomer Christian B. Luginbuhl who discovered this minor planet || 
|-id=937
| 26937 Makimiyamoto ||  || Maki Miyamoto (born 1977), Japanese actress || 
|-id=938
| 26938 Jackli ||  || Jack Zhihao Li (born 1994) is a finalist in the 2012 Intel Science Talent Search, a science competition for high-school seniors, for his bioengineering project. || 
|-id=939
| 26939 Jiachengli ||  || Jiacheng Li (born 1993) is a finalist in the 2012 Intel Science Talent Search, a science competition for high-school seniors, for his computer-science project. || 
|-id=940
| 26940 Quintero ||  || Oliver Adolfo Quintero (born 1993) is a finalist in the 2012 Intel Science Talent Search, a science competition for high-school seniors, for his chemistry project. || 
|-id=942
| 26942 Nealkuhn ||  || Neal Kuhn mentored a finalist in the 2012 Intel Science Talent Search, a science competition for high-school seniors. || 
|-id=945
| 26945 Sushko ||  || Andrey Sushko (born 1994) is a finalist in the 2012 Intel Science Talent Search, a science competition for high-school seniors, for his engineering project. || 
|-id=946
| 26946 Ziziyu ||  || Zizi Yu (born 1994) is a finalist in the 2012 Intel Science Talent Search, a science competition for high-school seniors, for her medicine and health project. || 
|-id=947
| 26947 Angelawang ||  || Angela Wang (born 1994) is a finalist in the 2012 Intel Science Talent Search, a science competition for high-school seniors, for her computer-science project. || 
|-id=948
| 26948 Annasato ||  || Anna Sato (born 1994) is a finalist in the 2012 Intel Science Talent Search, a science competition for high-school seniors, for her materials-science project. She attends the Ward Melville High School, East Setauket, New York || 
|-id=950
| 26950 Legendre ||  || Adrien-Marie Legendre (1752–1833), French mathematician known for the law of quadratic reciprocity and his formula for the distribution of prime numbers || 
|-id=954
| 26954 Skadiang || 1997 MG || Karen Skadiang (born 1962) , Australian amateur astronomer and friend of the discoverer Andrea Boattini || 
|-id=955
| 26955 Lie ||  || Sophus Lie (1842–1899), Norwegian mathematician known for the Lie group || 
|-id=960
| 26960 Liouville ||  || Joseph Liouville (1809–1882), French mathematician who first proved the existence of transcendental numbers. He also founded the Journal de Mathématiques Pures et Appliquées. || 
|-id=963
| 26963 Palorapavý ||  || Pavol Rapavý (born 1955), Slovak astronomer and director of the public observatory in Rimavská Sobota || 
|-id=969
| 26969 Biver || 1997 SE || Nicolas Biver (born 1969), French astronomer who observes and models cometary lines at radio wavelengths || 
|-id=970
| 26970 Eliáš ||  || Mojmír Eliáš (1932–2002), Czech geologist and planetologist || 
|-id=971
| 26971 Sezimovo Ústí ||  || Sezimovo Ústí, a town in southern Bohemia of the Czech Republic || 
|-id=973
| 26973 Lála ||  || Petr Lála (born 1942), Czech astronomer at the Ondřejov Observatory who served at the United Nations Office for Outer Space Affairs || 
|-id=984
| 26984 Fernand-Roland || 1997 VV || Fernand-Roland Merlin (1933–2005), French supporter of amateur astronomers and friend of Christophe Demeautis and Daniel Matter who discovered this minor planet || 
|-id=986
| 26986 Čáslavská ||  || Věra Čáslavská (born 1942), Czech gymnast and Olympic gold medalist, world's best sportswoman of 1968 || 
|-id=990
| 26990 Culbertson ||  || Frank Lee Culbertson Jr. (born 1949), former NASA astronaut, recorded the NASA program "Amateur Radio on the ISS" for the first time in Japan on 2001 Nov. 23 in Iruma City. || 
|-id=993
| 26993 Littlewood ||  || John Edensor Littlewood (1885–1977), English mathematician whose work included Diophantine approximations, number theory, the Riemann zeta function, inequalities and Fourier series. || 
|-id=998
| 26998 Iriso ||  || Iriso, the name of an area in Sayama-city, Saitama, Japan || 
|}

References 

026001-027000